Wohlsdorf is an Ortschaft (municipal division) of the town of Bernburg in Salzlandkreis, Saxony-Anhalt, Germany.

History 
It later became a municipality in the Salzlandkreis district and, in 2005, the community belonged to the historic collective municipality of Nienburg. When Nienburg was disbanded on 1 January 2010, it was incorporated into Bernburg, along with the communities of Baalberge, Biendorf, Gröna, Peißen, Poley, and Preußlitz.

Geography 
Included in Wohlsdorf is the village of Crüchern, which was also formerly a separate district. The river Ziethe forms a border between the Wohlsdorf subdistrict and the village of Mölz, a sub-district of Kleinpaschleben. The Ziethe flows first southwest then southeast along the border of the woods that stretch alongside Crüchern, forming a border between farmland and village of Wohlsdorf. It bends again southeasterly and around the western edge of Biendorf, another village-sub-district of Bradenburg on the southern border of Wohlsdorf.

Transportation 
 north of the village of Crüchern, Landesstraße 149 (L149) meets and becomes the continuation of federal road Bundesstraße 185 (B185) as it meets Bundesstraße 6n (B6n). Both highways run east towards Köthen, but B185 runs through Kleinpaschleben, Trinum, Großpaschleben, and Köthen while B6n runs parallel to B185, avoiding cities and towns by cutting through farmland and curving south around the city of Köthen to merge into north-south B183.

West of L149, B185 continues for  towards Bernburg, passing the Latdorf/Dröbel landfill between Latdorf and Dröbel until it meets international European route E49 and becomes B6.

Much of the traffic in Wohlsdorf is by car, but outside the subdistrict to the south in Biendorf are train and bus stations.

Demography

References 

Former municipalities in Saxony-Anhalt
Bernburg